Șerbănești is a commune in Olt County, Muntenia, Romania. It is composed of three villages: Șerbănești, Șerbăneștii de Sus, and Strugurelu.

Natives
 Paul Pîrșan

References

Communes in Olt County
Localities in Muntenia